Bhoomige Banda Bhagavantha is a 1981 Indian Kannada-language film, directed by K. S. L. Swamy (Ravee) and produced by S. P. Varadaraj and J. Chandulal Jain. The film stars Lokesh, Lakshmi, Jai Jagadish and Vajramuni. The film has musical score by G. K. Venkatesh. The movie was dubbed in Telugu.

Cast

Lokesh
Lakshmi
Jai Jagadish
Rojaramani
Vajramuni
C. R. Simha
Leelavathi in Guest appearance
K. S. Ashwath in Guest Appearance
Dinesh in Guest Appearance
Sundara Krishna Urs in Guest Appearance
Chethan Ramarao in Guest Appearance
Rajanand in Guest Appearance
Thyagaraj Urs in Guest Appearance
Master Lohith aka Puneeth Rajkumar

Soundtrack
The music was composed by G. K. Venkatesh.

References

External links
 

1981 films
1980s Kannada-language films
Films scored by G. K. Venkatesh
Films directed by K. S. L. Swamy